The 8 Metre was a sailing event on the Sailing at the 1920 Summer Olympics program in Ostend. Two type of 8 Metre classes were used. Four races were scheduled in each type. In total 19 sailors, on 4 boats, from 2 nation entered in the 8 Metre.

Race schedule

Course area

Weather conditions

Final results 
The 1920 Olympic scoring system was used. All competitors were male.

8 Metre International Rule 1907

8 Metre International Rule 1919

Daily standings

Notes 
 Since the official documentation of the 1920 Summer Olympics was written in 1957 many facts did disappear in time.
 Two type of 8 Metre classes were used. Those measured under the International Rule 1907 and one under the International Rule 1919.

Other information

Sailors
During the Sailing regattas at the 1920 Summer Olympics the following persons were competing:

Podium (1919 Rule)

Further reading

References 

8 Metre
8 Metre (keelboat)